Jalair, also Djalair, Yyalair, Jalayir, is one of the Darliqin Mongol tribes according to Rashid-al-Din Hamadani's Jami' al-tawarikh. They lived along the Shilka River in modern Zabaykalsky Krai of Russia.  After the Mongol conquest in the 13th century many Jalairs spread over Central Asia and the Middle East. Jalairs are one of the founding tribes of Mongolia's largest ethnic group Khalkha. Smaller clans named Jalayir are also found in Inner Mongolia in China. The Jalayirs who stayed in Central Asia under the rules of Genghis Khan's older sons' descendants eventually adopted Turkic language. They are found among the  Kazakhs of the Great jüz; also they are found among the Uzbeks (especially among Uzbeks of Southern Tajikistan and Afghanistan), Karakalpaks, and the Kyrgyz. The Jalairs who went to Iran and Iraq found the Jalairid Sultanate in 1330, and expanded into Turkey. The state was subjugated by the Kara Koyunlu in 1432.

Etymology
Yury Zuev proposed that the term Jalair (~ Yyalair) could be the Mongolian version of the Turkic name for the dynastic tribe of the Uyghur Khaganate (758-843): Yaglakar clan ~ yağla er ('anointed sovereign', Turkic ya:ğ il). Yaglakar (Ch. 藥羅葛/药罗葛 Yaoluoge) of the Tiele-Uyghur Toquz Oghuz confederacy.

Early history

The Jalair might be the Chaladi who were recorded in Chinese sources of 910. The Jalairs revolted against the Khitan rule in 1014. Subsequently, they were suppressed by the Khitans in the next year. Then the Jalayirs turned to the Mongol tribe and defeated the Borjigins utterly. But Khaidu of the Borjigin conquered and dispersed them among Mongol tribes around 1060.

The Jalair was one of the three core tribes in Khamag Mongol confederation in the 12th century. The Jalairs such as Mukhulai helped Genghis Khan to found his Empire. During the Mongol invasion of Khorazm in 1219–1223, Muqali campaigned in North China as the first prince of the state (guo-wang) and a viceroy. The Jalairs served under Great Khans as steward, chief judge, imperial tutor and advisor. Genghis Khan also gave 1,000 men under Jalair Moqe noyan to his son Chagatai Khan in Turkestan. And a body of the Jalair settled in Golden Horde.

Medieval Jalairs

When Möngke Khan ordered Hulagu (Alaghu) to conquer the Abbasid caliphate, the Ayyubids in Syria and the Mamluks in Egypt in 1252, the Jalairs prepared strong military contingent. Their commander Kok-Elege participated sieges of Persian and Arab fortresses from 1256 to 1261 and the battle against Berke's commander Nogai Khan in 1262.

Under Genghis Khan's successors, Muqali's descendants inherited his title and came to be one of the mainstays of Confucian influence in Kublaid Yuan Dynasty (1271–1368). The Jalairs were close to Great Khans in China and Il-khans in Iran. In Il-khanate, Jalair Buqa revolted against Tekuder Khan and installed Hulagu's grandson Arghun in 1284. But his coup was revealed and executed by his protégé later. After the death of Qazan Khan (r. 1343-1346), Chagatai Khanate fell under the control of nomadic Turco-Mongol clans: the Jalayir in the north, the Arlat in the west, the Barlas in the centre, the Qaraunas and the Qa'uchin in the south-west and the Dughlats in the east. 

Meanwhile, Hasan Buzurg established Jalayirid Dynasty and tried to reunite Turco-Mongol states in the name of his puppet khans in Iraq and western Persia of which fell into political chaos after the death of Il-khan Arpa Ke'un in 1336. When Tamerlane ravaged the Jalayirid Dynasty of Ahmad (1383–1410), Central Asian Jalairs were one of main clans in both Timurid Empire and Moghulistan. The Jalairids in Persia were finally overthrown by Kara Koyunlu Turks in 1432. But the Jalayirs in Central Asia were active for two more centuries.

In the 16th century, the Jalairs played important role in Eastern and Central Mongolian politics. They were one of the 14 clans of Khalkha tumen and Dayan Khan's son Gersenj was written in Mongolian chronicles as the prince of Jalayir (Jalaid).

Modern Jalairs

Mongolia
Jalairs are part of the Khalkha people of Mongolia.

China
In China, Jalairs (Jalaids) are a clan and a banner in the Jirim and Ordos Leagues, and Chahar of Inner Mongolia.

Iran
Timur brought 400 Jalair families to Khorasan. They live in Kalat-i-nadiri.
Until end of the 19th century, Kalat-i-nadiri had its own hereditary chief of Jalayir tribe, who held the fortress as feudatories of Persia. Under Nader Shah Afshar, Jalayirs rose to power and held important official positions within Persian government and military:

Qasem Ali Khan Jalayir - military commander during reign of Nader Shah Afshar.
Subedar Khan Jalayir - military commander during reign of Nader Shah Afshar.
Zal Khan Jalayir - military commander during reign of Shahrukh Afshar.

Hereditary rulers of Kalat-i-nadiri:
Tahmasp Qoli Khan Jalayir - vizier and military commander during reign of Nader Shah Afshar.
Yousef Ali Khan Jalayir - vizier and military commander during reign of Shahrukh Afshar.
Fath Ali Khan
Yalangtush Khan I (d.1826) - son of Fath Ali Khan, during the reign of Fath Ali Shah Qajar
Sayd Mohammad Khan - son of Fath Ali Khan and brother to Yalangtush Khan I, during the reign of Fath Ali Shah Qajar
son of Yalangtush Khan (d.1883)
Yalangtush Khan II (reigned from 1883 to 1885)

Indian subcontinent
There were Jalairs who served in the Mughal Empire as officials such as Mirak Bahadur Jalair.

Former USSR
Today Jalayir clans are a member of the Senior Jüz tribal union in Kazakhstan, they also are part of Uzbeks, Karakalpaks, and Kyrgyzes.

Jalair tribe in the Kazakh people 
From ancient times, Jalair tribe (Жалайыр in Kazakh Cyrillics, Jalaiyr in Kazakh Latin) is one of the major Kazakh tribes, in Kazakhstan Jalayir population numbers about 700,000, Jalairs belong to the Kazakh Senior Juz, they live mostly in the north, north-east and in the middle part of Kazakhstan, such as Saryarka region, Karagandy province, Akmola province, and east Kazakhstan province. Jalairs also are a part of few Kazakh populations in Uzbekistan and Russia (see the Jalair tribe of Kazakh people - from Wikipedia Jalair introduction in  Kazakh language).

References

Sources
 
 Christopher P. Atwood - Encyclopedia of Mongolia and the Mongol Empire , Facts on File, Inc. 2004.
 The Chinese government. By William Frederick Mayers, George Macdonald Home Playfair. Published by Kelly & Walsh, Limited, 1886.
 René Grousset "The Empire of the Steppes - a History of Central Asia" , Rutgers University Press, 6th paperback edition, 1999

 
Darlikin Mongols
History of Mongolia
Mongol peoples